Alampyris nigra is a species of beetle in the family Cerambycidae. It was described by Bates in 1881. It is known from Mexico.

References

Alampyris
Beetles described in 1881